Cicada (David Hersch) is a fictional character appearing in American comic books published by DC Comics.

Different incarnations of Cicada appeared in the fifth season of The Flash, portrayed by Chris Klein and Sarah Carter.

Publication history 
The character first appeared in The Flash (vol. 2) #171 (April 2001), created by Geoff Johns and Scott Kolins.

Fictional character biography 
Born in 1890, David Hersch was an architect and preacher at St. John's Catholic Church, though prone to paranoid, violent outbursts that often took the form of physical abuse of his wife Elizabeth Hersch. After murdering his wife, Hersch (sick with regret) sought to end his own life, when he was struck by a bolt of lightning. He discovered that he had gained the ability to absorb the life-force of others, extending his life-span almost a century. He believed the accident was the same as the Flash's and that they should be linked. The lightning bolt gave him a vision of his own immortality and foretold his wife's resurrection.

Over the subsequent years he operated as the cult leader "Cicada", accumulating many followers planning for the day he would resurrect his wife. Cicada's cult followers were dedicated to use lightning bolt shaped daggers to murder every one that the Flash has ever saved. He teams up with Magenta and manages to kidnap the Flash. Cicada reveals to Wally West that his wife was murdered and he was struck by lightning. Cicada saw a vision that he was destined to live on, together with his wife. By taking the energy left over from all the people the Flash has saved and from the Flash himself, Cicada succeeded in bringing his wife back from the dead. However, Elizabeth revealed that she was murdered by Cicada. Cicada denied this and killed his wife yet again by absorbing Elizabeth's energy through a kiss. He was eventually stopped by the Flash and Detective Jared Morillo and Officer Fred Chyre, though not before he managed to slash Morillo with his knife. This gave Morillo the ability to heal rapidly from any injury, similar to Cicada's own.

Cicada was put on death row in Iron Heights pending confirmation by S.T.A.R. Labs that he could even be killed in the first place, but escaped during Gorilla Grodd's jailbreak.

Cicada later appeared at Captain Boomerang's funeral after Identity Crisis and accepted an invitation to join Alexander Luthor, Jr.'s Secret Society of Super-Villains during the "Infinite Crisis" storyline.

During the "Salvation Run" storyline, Cicada is one of the various super criminals sent to the penal colony on the planet Cygnus 4019, which has been nicknamed Salvation.

Powers and abilities 
Cicada has the ability to steal the life-force of other living beings and use it to prolong his own life and regenerate physical damage. Cicada is an immortal and cannot die.

Equipment 
David Hersch carries two hilted blades capable of absorbing the life force of its victims and resurrecting the dead.

In other media 

Multiple versions of Cicada appear in the fifth season of The Flash:
 Chris Klein portrays Orlin Dwyer,  a lower middle-class individual who gains super-strength and a telekinetically controlled lightning-shaped dagger able to nullify most metahumans' powers after being struck by a fragment of the Thinker's exploding satellite. Amidst the same incident, another fragment struck his niece Grace Gibbons (portrayed by Islie Hirvonen), putting her into a coma. As Cicada, Dwyer vowed to exterminate all metahumans, whom he blames for the death of his sister as well as what happened to Grace. Dwyer's vendetta brings him into conflict with the Flash and his allies, but he eventually agrees to take a metahuman cure developed by S.T.A.R. Labs as it could also be used to cure Grace, who also became a metahuman. This experience and the file on Grace's parents' deaths causes him to realize that his anti-metahuman prejudice was excessive and acknowledge that the circumstances suggest an accident rather than a deliberate attack. However, he is killed by a future version of Grace, who had become consumed by her own vendetta. 
 Sarah Carter portrays an adult Grace Gibbons, also known as Cicada II. Hailing from a future where metahumans thrived and she acquired similar powers as him along with energy manipulation, she traveled back in time to complete what she believes is still her uncle's mission, having adopted Orlin's hatred of metahumans after overhearing him while in her comatose state. When Orlin reveals his change of heart and tries to get his niece to abandon her plan, Grace kills him and develops a plan to weaponize the meta cure so it would kill metahumans instead. However, the Flash destroys Dwyer's dagger with a mirror gun, erasing Grace's future self from existence while her younger self awakens from her coma, abandons her anti-metahuman feelings, takes the cure, and is placed in foster care.
 Chris Webb portrays David Hersch, the original timeline version of Cicada and someone that the Flash, Green Arrow, Supergirl, and the Legends all failed to catch. Moreover, Hersch exists as Cicada across the multiverse, with Sherloque Wells having captured him on 37 different Earths. However, after XS inadvertently altered Earth-1's timeline at the end of the fourth season, Dwyer became Cicada instead while Hersch was apprehended by the police for serial bombing.

References

External links 
Hyperborea entry for Cicada
Crimson Lightning  – An online index to the comic book adventures of the Flash.

Comics characters introduced in 2001
Characters created by Geoff Johns
Characters created by Scott Kolins
DC Comics characters with accelerated healing
DC Comics female supervillains
DC Comics supervillains
DC Comics martial artists
DC Comics metahumans
Fictional characters with energy-manipulation abilities
Fictional characters with absorption or parasitic abilities
Fictional characters with immortality
Fictional cult leaders
Fictional serial killers
Fictional preachers
Fictional architects
Flash (comics) characters